Michael 'Dandy Kim' Caborn-Waterfield (1 January 1930 – 4 May 2016) was a British businessman and entrepreneur. He is best known for setting up the first Ann Summers sex shop in 1970.

References

1930 births
2016 deaths
British retail company founders
English businesspeople in retailing
20th-century English businesspeople